Badge of Honor is a 1934 American drama film directed by Spencer Gordon Bennet and starring Buster Crabbe, Ruth Hall and Betty Blythe. It was produced on Poverty Row as a second feature for distribution by Mayfair Pictures. Crabbe was loaned out from Paramount Pictures for the production. The film's sets were designed by the art director Paul Palmentola.

Synopsis
Reporter Bob Gordon is hired by the owner of a newspaper to try and rescue it from deliberate attempts at sabotage driven by a rival acting in league with the paper's own editor.

Cast
 Buster Crabbe as 	Bob Gordon
 Ruth Hall as 	Helen Brewster
 Ralph Lewis as 	Randall Brewster
 Betty Blythe as 	Mrs. Claire van Alstyne
 John Trent as	Harvey Larkin, City Editor
 Ernie Adams as 	'Tip' Crane
 Allan Cavan as Preston, the Lawyer 
 Charles McAvoy as 	'Trim' Fuller
 Broderick O'Farrell as 	Howard Kent
 William Arnold as	Andrew Comstock

References

Bibliography
 Pitts, Michael R. Poverty Row Studios, 1929–1940: An Illustrated History of 55 Independent Film Companies, with a Filmography for Each. McFarland & Company, 2005.

External links

1934 films
American drama films
1934 drama films
1930s English-language films
American black-and-white films
Films directed by Spencer Gordon Bennet
Mayfair Pictures films
1930s American films